Justice Curtis refers to Benjamin Robbins Curtis (1809–1874), associate justice of the Supreme Court of the United States. Justice Curtis may also refer to:

Howard J. Curtis, associate justice of the Connecticut Supreme Court
Jehu Curtis (1692–1753), Colonial justice of the Delaware Supreme Court
Jesse W. Curtis Sr. (1865–1960), associate justice of the Supreme Court of California